There were two civil wars in the Kingdom of Navarre in the Middle Ages:
Navarrese Civil War (1276–1277), also called the War of the Navarrese Succession
Navarrese Civil War (1451–1455)